Wyatt Kalynuk (born April 14, 1997) is a Canadian professional ice hockey defenseman for the Hartford Wolf Pack of the American Hockey League (AHL) while under contract to the New York Rangers of the National Hockey League (NHL). He was selected in the seventh round, 196th overall, by the Philadelphia Flyers in the 2017 NHL Entry Draft. He previously played for the Wisconsin Badgers in the NCAA.

Early life
Kalynuk was born on April 14, 1997 in Brandon, Manitoba, and was raised in nearby Virden by parents Leanne and Randy Kalynuk. He began playing minor ice hockey with the Virden Minor Hockey Association, and would practice for hours per day at an outdoor rink outside Virden Junior High School. Kalynuk says that, while many of his youth hockey teammates aspired to play in the National Hockey League (NHL), he "was just thinking about playing the game for fun". His minor hockey career continued with the Southwest Cougars of the Manitoba U-18 'AAA' Hockey League. In one season with the U18 AAA Cougars, Kalynuk scored one goal and 17 points in 43 games.

Playing career

Amateur
Kalynuk was given an opportunity to begin playing for the Western Hockey League when he turned 16, but he was physically smaller than most of the other players, so he decided to spend one season playing junior ice hockey in Manitoba. He spent the 2013–14 hockey season with the Virden Oil Capitals of the Manitoba Junior Hockey League (MJHL). He was the youngest member on the team that year, playing on a defensive pair with Brad Reichardt. Kalynuk scored seven points in his first 25 games as a member of the Oil Capitals, and scored his first junior hockey goal on November 23, 2013, in a 7–0 victory over the OCN Blizzard. At the conclusion of the season, Kalynuk was named to the MJHL's All-Rookie Team.

Professional
Kalynuk made his NHL debut on March 7, 2021, in a 6–3 loss against the Tampa Bay Lightning. His first NHL goal also happened to be the game-winning goal, coming late in the second period of a 4–3 victory against the Columbus Blue Jackets on April 10.

As an impending restricted free agent following the 2021–22 season, Kalynuk was not tendered a qualifying offer by the rebuilding Blackhawks, and was released to free agency on 12 July 2022. The following day Kalynuk was signed to a one-year, two-way contract to join the Vancouver Canucks. He was traded to the New York Rangers in exchange for future considerations on March 3, 2023.

Career statistics

Regular season and playoffs

International

Awards and honours

References

External links
 

1997 births
Living people
Abbotsford Canucks players
Chicago Blackhawks players
Hartford Wolf Pack players
Ice hockey people from Manitoba
Lincoln Stars players
Philadelphia Flyers draft picks
Rockford IceHogs (AHL) players
Sportspeople from Brandon, Manitoba
Virden Oil Capitals players
Wisconsin Badgers men's ice hockey players